Mary Cooper may refer to:

 Mary Cooper (publisher) (died 1761), English publisher and bookseller 
 Mary Little Cooper (born 1946), U.S. federal judge
 Mary-Charlotte Cooper, bassist and vocalist for The Subways

Characters
 Mary Cooper (The Big Bang Theory), a character in The Big Bang Theory
 Mary Cooper (Torchwood), a recurring character in Torchwood
 Mary Cooper, a character in Harlots

See also
 Cooper (surname)